Douglas Wilson (1950–1992) was a Canadian gay activist, graduate student, publisher and writer born in Saskatchewan. In 1975, he gained prominence in a fight for gay rights with the University of Saskatchewan. The university's dean of the College of Education refused to allow Wilson into the school system to supervise practice teachers because of his public involvement with the gay liberation movement. Wilson was vice-president of the Gay Community Centre Saskatoon and had been trying to start a gay academic union at the university. The Saskatchewan Human Rights Commission failed to protect Wilson and his case was unsuccessful.

Wilson spent most of his life fighting for human rights issues, activism and AIDS organizations. In 1977 he founded Stubblejumper Press, a small publishing house dedicated to works by Canadian lesbians and gay men. The company's first title was Wilson's own poetry collection The Myth of the Boy. He served as executive director of the Saskatchewan Association on Human Rights from 1978 to 1983. In 1983 Wilson moved to Toronto to work for the Toronto Board of Education as an advisor to the Race Relations and Equal Opportunity Office. In 1984 he became one of the founding publishers of Rites: for lesbian and gay liberation.

Wilson was the first openly gay candidate to be nominated by a major political party to stand for Parliament, as a candidate of the New Democratic Party in the Toronto riding of Rosedale in the 1988 election. During the campaign he was diagnosed with AIDS. He spent the rest of his life as an AIDS activist, helping to found AIDS Action Now! and founding chairperson of the Canadian Network of Organizations for People Living With AIDS. Wilson published his partner Peter McGehee's novels, Boys Like Us (1991) and Sweetheart (1992). One month before his death, he completed McGehee's notes of his third novel, Labour of Love (1993).  Wilson died on September 24, 1992 at the age of 42.

In 1995 the University of Saskatchewan's gay organization (Gays and Lesbians at the U of S, GLUS) established the Doug Wilson Award, given annually to honour those individuals who have shown leadership and courage in advancing the rights of gays & lesbians at the University of Saskatchewan. The University of Saskatchewan Students' Union (USSU) has presented the award since 2001, after GLUS folded following the establishment of the USSU-run Pride Centre.

Stubblejumper, a film about Doug Wilson, was screened in venues across Saskatchewan in March 2009. It was directed by Saskatchewan filmmaker David Geiss.

In honour of his role as a significant builder of LGBT culture and history in Canada, a portrait of Wilson by artist Alfred Ng is held in The ArQuives: Canada's LGBTQ2+ Archives' National Portrait Collection.

References

External links

1950 births
1992 deaths
Gay politicians
Canadian gay writers
Canadian LGBT politicians
Canadian LGBT rights activists
AIDS-related deaths in Canada
Deaths from pneumonia in Ontario
People from Meadow Lake, Saskatchewan
Writers from Saskatchewan
New Democratic Party candidates for the Canadian House of Commons
Ontario candidates for Member of Parliament
Canadian male novelists
20th-century Canadian novelists
20th-century Canadian poets
Canadian male poets
Canadian LGBT poets
Canadian LGBT novelists
20th-century Canadian male writers
20th-century Canadian LGBT people
Gay poets
Gay novelists